Andreas Küttel (born 25 April 1979) is a Swiss former ski jumper who currently works in the field of sports science at the University of Southern Denmark.

Career
Küttel won five World Cup competitions from 2005 to 2007, and placed third in the overall World Cup in 2006. He won a gold medal in the individual large hill event at the 2009 Ski Jumping World Championships. Küttel also competed at three Winter Olympics, earning his best finish of fifth in the individual normal hill event in 2006.

World Cup

Standings

Wins

References

 
 

1979 births
Living people
Olympic ski jumpers of Switzerland
Ski jumpers at the 2002 Winter Olympics
Ski jumpers at the 2006 Winter Olympics
Ski jumpers at the 2010 Winter Olympics
Swiss male ski jumpers
FIS Nordic World Ski Championships medalists in ski jumping
People from Einsiedeln
Swiss emigrants to Denmark
Sportspeople from the canton of Schwyz